Von Guerard Glacier is a glacier between Crescent Glacier and Aiken Glacier on the north slope of Kukri Hills, Victoria Land. Named by Advisory Committee on Antarctic Names (US-ACAN) (1997) from association with Von Guerard Stream, which flows north from this glacier into Taylor Valley.

References

Glaciers of Victoria Land
McMurdo Dry Valleys